(Latin for 'an enemy of mankind') is a legal term of art that originates in admiralty law. Before the adoption of public international law, pirates and slavers were already held to be beyond legal protection and so could be dealt with by any nation, even one that had not been directly attacked.

A comparison can be made between this concept and the common law "writ of outlawry", which declared a person outside the king's law, a literal out-law, subject to violence and execution by anyone. The ancient Roman civil law concept of proscription, and the status of  conveyed by proscription may also be similar.

Background
Perhaps the oldest of the laws of the sea is the prohibition of piracy, as the peril of being set upon by pirates, who are not motivated by national allegiance, is shared by the vessels and mariners of all nations, and thus represents a crime upon all nations. Since piracy anywhere is a peril to every mariner and ship everywhere, it is held to be the universal right and the universal duty of all nations, regardless of whether their ships have been beset by the particular band of pirates in question, to capture, try by a regularly constituted court-martial or admiralty court (in extreme circumstances, by means of a drumhead court-martial convened by the officers of the capturing ship), and, if found guilty, to execute the pirate via means of hanging from the yard-arm of the capturing ship, an authoritative custom of the sea.

Although summary battlefield punishment was conducted by certain nations at certain times with regard to pirates, it was regarded as irregular (but lawful if the attenuation of due process was dictated by urgent military necessity), as individuals captured with pirates could potentially have a defense to charges of piracy, such as coercion. As the summary punishment, in this case, was due to military necessity, there was clear evidence of the offense, and it was done proximate in time and location to the battlefield, it can be classified as merely irregular, and not a violation of the custom of the sea.

Theorized extended usages of the term

The land and airborne analogues of pirates, bandits and hijackers are not subject to universal jurisdiction in the same way as piracy; this is despite arguments that they should be. Instead these crimes, along with terrorism, torture, crimes against internationally protected persons and the financing of terrorism are subject to the aut dedere aut judicare principle (meaning prosecute or extradite). In the current global climate of international terrorism some commentators have called for terrorists of all sorts to be treated hostis humani generis.

Other commentators, such as John Yoo, have called for the extension of this hypothetical connection of hostis humani generis from pirates to hijackers to terrorists all the way to that of "unlawful enemy combatants". Unlawful enemy combatants, or persons captured in war who do not fight on behalf of a recognized sovereign state, have become an increasingly common phenomenon in contemporary wars, such as the War in Afghanistan, Iraq War, Chechen Wars and Syrian Civil War.

Actual extended usages of the term

The only actual extension of  blessed by courts of law has been its extension to torturers. This has been done by decisions of U.S. and international courts; specifically, in a case tried in the United States in 1980, Filártiga v. Peña-Irala, 630 F.2d 876, the United States 2nd Circuit Court ruled that it could exercise jurisdiction over agents of the Government of Paraguay (in their individual capacity)  who were found to have committed the crime of torture against a Paraguayan citizen, using its jurisdiction under the Offenses Clause of the Constitution of the United States, the Alien Tort Claims Act, and customary international law. In deciding this, the court famously stated that "Indeed, for purposes of civil liability, the torturer has become like the pirate and slave trader before him: , an enemy of all mankind." This usage of the term  has been reinforced by the ruling of the International Criminal Tribunal for the Former Yugoslavia in the conviction of a torturer in Prosecutor v. Furundžija.

The prosecution, however, invoked the standard, ultimately cited in the verdict by reference to piracy.

See also
Aut dedere aut judicare
Banning
Habeas corpus
Homo sacer
Outlawry
Persona non grata
Torture
Universal jurisdiction
Protect America Act Section 105B(l)
November 13, 2001 Presidential Military Order

Reference

Universal jurisdiction
Law of the sea
Piracy law
Anti-piracy
International criminal law
Latin legal terminology